Salam Hashim (born 1966) is an Iraqi football coach and former player. He played as a defender. He competed in the men's tournament at the 1988 Summer Olympics.

Appearances in films
Hashim makes a cameo appearance with Falah Hassan, Laith Hussein and Karim Saddam, in the 1993 Iraqi film: 100%.

Honours

Club
Al-Rasheed
Asian Club Championship Runners-up: 1988–89
Arab Club Champions Cup winners (3): 1985, 1986, 1987
Iraqi Premier League: winners (3): 1986–87, 1987–88, 1988–89
Iraq FA Cup winners (2): 1986–87, 1987–88
Al-Zawraa
Iraqi Premier League winners (4): 1990–91, 1993–94, 1994–95, 1995–96
Iraq FA Cup winners (5): 1990–91, 1992–93, 1993–94, 1994–95, 1995–96
Iraqi Elite Cup: 1991

International
Arab Nations Cup: 1988
Peace and Friendship Cup: 1989

Individual
Most player to win titles in the Iraqi Premier League: 7 times (joint record)

References

External links
Iraq - Record International Players at rsssf.com

Iraqi footballers
1966 births
Living people
Al-Zawraa SC players
Iraq international footballers
Sportspeople from Baghdad
Association football defenders
Olympic footballers of Iraq
Footballers at the 1988 Summer Olympics
Iraqi football managers
Iraqi expatriate football managers
Expatriate football managers in the United Arab Emirates
Iraqi expatriate sportspeople in the United Arab Emirates
Al-Zawraa SC managers